Minhe Hui and Tu Autonomous County is the easternmost county in Qinghai Province, China. It is under the administration of Haidong (lit. Eastern Qinghai) Region. "Hui" refers to the Chinese Muslims, whereas "Tu" refers to the ethnic group known as “Monguor” in the West and as "Tu Zu" in China. It borders the Honggu District of Gansu on the east, demarcated by the Datong River, a tributary to the Huangshui River, which eventually flows into the Yellow River.

The County is multi-ethnic and significant to not only holding the most densely populated Tu Zu settlement in Sanchuan/Guanting in its southeastern portion, but also as the homeland of the legendary Emperor Yü the Great, who established the Xia Dynasty (2070–1600 BC), the first ever recorded dynasty in the ancient Chinese history based on recent archaeological discoveries.

Administrative divisions 
Minhe is divided into 8 towns and 14 townships, including 1 ethnic township. The county government is seated in Chuankou.

Demographics 
In 2019 the county had a registered population of 438,100 people. The county's urban population was 117,200 people, whereas the remaining 320,900 people lived in rural areas. The county recorded a birth rate of 10.90 per thousand, and a death rate of 4.44 per thousand, giving the county a rate of natural increase of 6.46 per thousand.

Ethnic groups 
As of 2019, 38.28% of the county's population was ethnically Han Chinese. A 2004 report by the National Ethnic Affairs Commission reported that 44.51% of the county's population was ethnically Han Chinese, 40.45% was ethnically Hui, 11.26% was ethnically Monguor, and 3.55% was ethnically Tibetan.

Languages 
The county has large populations of Hui, Tibetan, and Tu people, whose languages are commonly spoken in varying parts of the county.

Climate

Economy 
Minhe's GDP stood at 10.349 billion Yuan in 2019, of which, 1.329 billion Yuan came from the county's primary sector, 4.249 billion Yuan came from the county's secondary sector, and 4.771 billion Yuan came from the county's tertiary sector. The county's GDP per capita stood at 27,745 Yuan as of 2019.

The county's per capita disposable income was 18,487 Yuan in 2019, which stood at 31,432 Yuan for urban residents, and 11,706 Yuan for rural residents. Minhe's unemployment rate stood at 3.22% at the end of 2019. Retail sales in the county totaled 2.820 billion Yuan in 2019, of which, urban sales accounted for 1.448 billion, and rural sales accounted for 1.372 billion.

Agriculture 
In 2019, 623,600 mu of land was sown, of which, 235,500 mu was sown for corn, 119,600 mu was sown for potatoes, 103,700 mu was sown for wheat, 69,100 mu was sown for seed oils, and 46,000 mu was sown for vegetables and mushrooms. Animal husbandry is also common in Minhe, and the county's farmers have sizable populations of cattle, sheep, pigs, and poultry.

Industry 
The county's largest industries are the production of cement, ferroalloys, aluminium, and graphite.

Education 
As of 2019, the county had 10,962 kindergarten students, 33,609 primary school students, 15,539 junior high students, 9,953 standard secondary school students, and 5,446 vocational secondary school students.

Culture 
A number of cultural traditions unique to particular regions in Minhe County have been recorded, and are generally attributed to the large amount of inter-ethnic contact in the region.

The region has a number of traditions unique to giving birth to a child, including unique midwifing practices, a "step on birth" tradition where families invite a guest to visit their newborn in the hopes of the baby inheriting the guest's positive personality traits, a celebration for a newborn's 30th day known as a "baimanyue", and consulting books which host clan-specific baby names in order to name newborns.

Ethnic Monguor and Tibetan weddings in the area are remarkable in that they involve more singing than their Han Chinese counterparts.

See also
 List of administrative divisions of Qinghai

References

County-level divisions of Qinghai
Haidong
Hui autonomous counties
Monguor autonomous counties